Papel (Pepel, Papei), or Oium (Moium), is a Bak language of Guinea-Bissau.

Papel is the language spoken by the Papel people, who live in the central coastal regions of Guinea-Bissau, namely the Biombo Region where it is spoken by 136,000 Bissau-Guineans. Papel speakers are estimated to be around 140,000 in total globally.

Papel has 79,000 speakers living on Bissau Island (called (b)uhlawʔ or (b)usawʔ in Papel). Dialects include Biombo (Papel: uyomʔ) in the southwest and Safim (Papel: safli) in the northeast.

Classification
Papel is part of the Bak language family based in the Senegal/Guinea-Bissau region, thus it is linguistically similar to the Mankanya and Mandjak languages, members of the 'Papel languages' a language sub-family. Today, Papel, along with its linguistic neighbours uses Latin-based script.

References

Further reading

External links 
Basic Papel phrases and discussion: https://www.youtube.com/watch?v=jca7e7-z9CQ

Papel languages